Arne Vidstrom is a Microsoft Windows security expert. He is noted for discovering a number of Windows security vulnerabilities, as well as for developing the Wups toolkit, "arguably the best freeware UDP scanner for NT".

References

People associated with computer security
Living people
Year of birth missing (living people)
Place of birth missing (living people)